Alton is a very small village in Derbyshire, England. Alton is in the civil parish of Ashover, and is around 2 miles away from Clay Cross although it is not part of the town. The village does not have a church, a school or a public house; the nearest public house is in Ashover. Being a rural community, Alton is surrounded by several farms.

Alton also has easy access to local landmark Ashover Rock, or the Fabrick as it is locally known.

See also 
Listed buildings in Idridgehay and Alton
List of places in Derbyshire

References

External links

Villages in Derbyshire
Towns and villages of the Peak District
North East Derbyshire District